Jim Clayburgh (born 23 May 1949) is a scenic designer. He was a founding member of The Wooster Group and served as the group's resident designer from 1975 to 1994. He currently lives in Brussels, Belgium, where he founded the company JOJI INC with choreographer and dancer , and continues to design for theatre, film, dance and opera both in the USA and in Europe.

Life and career 
Jim Clayburgh is the brother of actress Jill Clayburgh (1944–2010). With partner Johanne Saunier, he has two sons.  

Clayburgh holds a Bachelor of Arts degree from Claremont McKenna College, majoring in design at Pomona College, and a Master of Fine Arts degree in Theatre Design from New York University School Of The Arts. In the USA he has taught masterclasses at MIT, New York Tisch School of the Arts, University of California Santa Cruz, University of Michigan, Hollins University, Simons Rock College of Art. In Europe, he has taught at St Luc's Ecole Supérieur des Arts and the International School of Brussels. 

He was part of the design team for the interior renovations of two major concert halls in Brussels: La Maison de la Radio at Flagey, Ixelles, and Le Palais des Beaux Arts. 

In 2011 he gave a keynote address at the 41st International Theatre Festival at the Venice Biennale.  

In 2013-14 he was a Visiting Artist at the American Academy of Rome. 

Clayburgh was a member of the jury and gave a design workshop at Prague Quadrennial of Performance Design and Space in 2019, and he was a key speaker at the 2015 edition.

In 2020, he collaborated with German soprano Sarah Maria Sun on texts for concerts and lyrics for songs.

Approaches to scenic design 
In conversation with Matthew Maguire:

"It interests me as a designer: looking for subconscious memories of space."

"The distraction of a twenty-minute light change in a concert setting seems to block the ability to listen for some. I find it a form of relaxation, a second track of active involved meditation. I'm surprised how few people shut their eyes when listening."

Awards and articles

Awards 
OBIE award for Sustained Achievement (The Wooster Group) (1991).

OBIE award for Sustained Achievement In Design (1982).

Articles 
"A Space For Oedipus" – profile in Theatre Design & Technology, by Arnold Aronson (1978).

"Plywood and electronics" – profile in Theatre Crafts, by Tish Dace (1984).

Design work

The Performance Group (1973–1978)

The Wooster Group (1975–1994)

Scenic design (other)

Lighting design (dance)

Scenic and lighting design (1989–present)

References

External links
Joji inc. website

American scenic designers
Living people
1949 births
Claremont McKenna College alumni
New York University alumni
Artists from New York City